Christopher Robert McNairn Chaplin (born 13 December 1938) is a former English cricketer.  Chaplin was a right-handed batsman who bowled right-arm off break.  He was born in Calcutta, Bengal in the British Raj.

Chaplin made his Minor Counties Championship debut for Cornwall in 1966 against Devon.  From 1966 to 1978, he represented the county in 51 Minor Counties Championship matches, the last of which came against the Somerset Second XI.

Chaplin also represented Cornwall in 3 List A matches.  These against Glamorgan in the 1970 Gillette Cup, Oxfordshire in the 1975 Gillette Cup and Lancashire in the 1977 Gillette Cup.  In his 3 List A matches, he scored 45 runs at a batting average of 15.00, with a high score of 22.

References

External links
Christopher Chaplin at Cricinfo
Christopher Chaplin at CricketArchive

1938 births
Living people
Cricketers from Kolkata
English cricketers
Cornwall cricketers